is a former female long-distance runner from Japan. She twice represented her native country at the Summer Olympics: 1992 and 1996. Suzuki is best known for winning the world title in the women's marathon at the 1997 World Championships in Athens, Greece (1997).

Suzuki was a torchbearer at the 1998 Winter Olympics Opening Ceremonies in Nagano.

She is married to former sprinter Koji Ito.

Personal bests
3000 metres — 9:21.92 (01/01/1987)
5000 metres — 15:30.43 (25/07/1999)
10,000 metres — 31:19.40 (09/06/1996)
Half Marathon — 1:10:33 (18/07/1999)
Marathon — 2:26:27 (28/01/1996)

References

1968 births
Living people
Sportspeople from Chiba Prefecture
Japanese female long-distance runners
Japanese female marathon runners
Olympic athletes of Japan
Athletes (track and field) at the 1992 Summer Olympics
Athletes (track and field) at the 1996 Summer Olympics
World Athletics Championships athletes for Japan
World Athletics Championships medalists
World Athletics Championships winners
Japan Championships in Athletics winners
20th-century Japanese women
21st-century Japanese women